The King: The Story of Graham Kennedy is an Australian television film examining the life of Australian entertainer Graham Kennedy.

Produced in Australia by the Sydney based independent production company Crackerjack Productions for TV1 and the Nine Network, The King was first shown on 20 May 2007 on TV1 for Foxtel and Austar and became the highest rating drama ever screened on subscription television in Australia, drawing 511,000 viewers. It later aired on the Nine Network on 27 August 2007.

The film faced criticism from some of those close to Kennedy who felt it did not portray him accurately, feeling that he was portrayed too broadly in a dark manner in the film, as well as what one commentator noted was a "mad rush to out him, sexually".

Production
The screenplay was written by Jaime Browne and Kris Mrksa; the director was Matthew Saville and the producer was Jason Stephens. Filming began on 6 December 2006 with a  budget and a 20-day shooting schedule. The ABC's Ripponlea studios were utilised to film the scenes for sequences involving Kennedy's roles on In Melbourne Tonight and Blankety Blanks.

Stephen Curry (who plays the role of Graham Kennedy) lost 14 kilograms to portray the young Kennedy, and then regained the weight in two weeks over Christmas 2006 to play the older Kennedy.

Cast
 Stephen Curry (Graham Kennedy)
 Stephen Hall (Bert Newton)
 Shaun Micallef (Colin Bednall)
 Monica Maughan (Nan)
 Jane Allsop (Noeline Brown)
 Angus Sampson (Ugly Dave Gray)
 Steve Bisley (Harry M. Miller)
 Leo Taylor (Sir Frank Packer)
 Beau Brady (Tim)
 Bernard Curry (John Wesley)
 Kodi Smit-McPhee (Young John Wesley)
 Beth Buchanan (Val Wesley)
 Garry McDonald (Nicky Whitta)
 Roz Hammond (Kathleen Whitta)
 Kate Doherty (Panda)
 Cathy Godbold (Rosemary Margan)

Reception

Pre-release
A Herald Sun article published on 28 November 2006 headed "Pals protect mate" reported that Kennedy's friends Bert Newton, Noeline Brown and her husband TV writer Tony Sattler were "refusing to help producers of a telemovie about his life."

The article stated that "Bert Newton knocked back an approach to work on The King, telling industry sources Kennedy would not have approved of his story being told" and quoted Sattler as saying "He was never himself, always playing the character called Graham Kennedy, so I don't know how they'd find someone who could manage to play the part." It also stated "The movie is not linked with [the] controversial book "The King & I", launched in the prior month by Kennedy's former lover, Rob Astbury."

Post-release
Kennedy's biographer Graeme Blundell wrote in The Australian:

Stephen Curry gets most of this right in his compelling portrayal of the sphinx-like and teasingly evasive television comedian [...]

He is so very, very good his career may never recover. The "Weren't you Graham Kennedy?" syndrome will likely pursue him every time he tries to buy groceries. As it did the King [...]

Curry is terrific and, although instantly recognisable as the oyster-eyed performer, doesn't impersonate him (though he says he tested prosthetic eyes) so much as inhabit him [...]

Awards
At the 2007 Australian Film Institute Awards The King won the award for Best Telefeature or Miniseries. Curry also picked up the award for Best Lead Actor in a Television Drama and Saville for Best Direction in Television.

See also 
 List of biographical films

References

Other references 
King Cast For TV1
Graham Kennedy – the telemovie
King given plenty of Curry
Reassessments: From the castle to the kingdom

External links 
 
 

TV1 (Australian TV channel) original programming
2007 television films
2007 films
2007 biographical drama films
Australian drama television films
Australian biographical drama films
Television series by Fremantle (company)
2007 drama films
Biographical films about entertainers